Aleksander Konjajev (3 June 1909 – 10 April 1995) was a Russian Empire-born Yugoslav agronomist and dean of the Biotechnology Faculty at the University of Ljubljana.  He was an expert on microbiology of dairy farming.

He wrote numerous scientific books and articles as well as popular science books. He won the Levstik Award twice, in 1984 for his book Nevidni živi svet (The Invisible Living World) and in 1991 for Nejc in drobnoživke (Nejc and Tiny Bugs).

References 

1909 births
1995 deaths
Soviet emigrants to Yugoslavia
Yugoslav agronomists
Levstik Award laureates
Academic staff of the University of Ljubljana
People from Mikhaylovsky District, Ryazan Oblast
20th-century agronomists